Dianeura jacksoni is a species of moth of the Anomoeotidae family. It was described from Manda Island in Kenya.

The wingspan is 22–31 mm. It is hyaline (glass-like) white, the base of the primaries and basal half of the secondaries suffused with pale yellow. The veins and antennae are blackish and the body is pale brown above and brownish testaceous (reddish yellow or brownish) below. The legs are almost bare.

References

Anomoeotidae